Thomas McKnight was an American from Mineral Point, Wisconsin Territory who served in the 1st Wisconsin Territorial Assembly. He served in the House of Representatives (the lower house) at the same time as Thomas McKnight of Dubuque in the Iowa District was serving in the Council (the upper house).

Background 
McKnight came to Mineral Point before 1832.

Public office 
In October 1836, McKnight was elected as one of seven members of the House of Representatives from Iowa County, which would hold three sessions between October 25, 1836 and June 25, 1838. When Mineral Point was first chartered as a "borough" (as townships were then called) in 1837, McKnight was elected as its first President (equivalent to mayor).

Forty-Niner 
In February 1851, McKnight was among the many people listed as having left Mineral Point for California during the California Gold Rush. His name was not among those marked as having already returned, or who had died, or both.

References 

Members of the Wisconsin Territorial Legislature
People from Mineral Point, Wisconsin
Mayors of places in Wisconsin
19th-century American politicians